Vanity 6 is the 1982 debut and only studio album by American vocal girl group Vanity 6 released on Warner Bros. Records. The group  had been created by Prince as an outlet for his prolific song writing. All three women in the group (Vanity, Brenda Bennett, Susan Moonsie) shared lead and background vocals. As was typical for Prince's side projects, he obscured his virtually complete responsibility for the production, songwriting, and instrumental performances by arbitrarily attributing the credits to other members of his musical stable or the fictional "The Starr Company". "If a Girl Answers (Don't Hang Up)" was co-written with The Time member Terry Lewis and "Bite the Beat" was co-written with Jesse Johnson.

"He's So Dull" was written by Dez Dickerson and can be heard briefly in the 1983 film National Lampoon's Vacation. The "other woman" rap on the song "If a Girl Answers (Don't Hang Up)" is performed by Prince in an effected voice whose resemblance to that of The Time's lead singer Morris Day has sometimes led to Day being misidentified as the performer.

The album was originally released on August 11, 1982 by Warner Bros. Records on LP and cassette. A compact disc was issued in September 1988. All three formats are now out of print. Vinyl copies of the album were pressed with "Side 1" and "Side 6" on the label. Reviewing the album in The Village Voice, Robert Christgau wrote, "All eight of these dumb, dancy little synth tunes get me off when I let my guard down, and most of them are funny, hooky, and raunchy at the same time." The album was later certified gold by the RIAA  in 1983 a year after its release due in large part to the smash success of Prince's 1999. This would be the only album released by Vanity 6.

Track listing

Charts

Certifications

Cover versions
 Several artists have covered "Nasty Girl", including Inaya Day, Lene Alexandra, and Nuttin' Nyce. (See Nasty Girl (Vanity 6 song)#Cover versions.)
 The song "Make-Up" was covered by The Soft Pink Truth on the album Do You Party? in 2003, by UK electro duo The Most in 2004, and by Amanda Blank on her 2009 album I Love You.
 "Drive Me Wild" was covered by Foo Fighters and was released on their second full length album, The Colour and the Shape, when it was re-released in 2007.
 In 2019, the demo version of "Make-Up" by Prince was released on his posthumous album Originals.

References

External links
 Release history at Discogs

1982 debut albums
Vanity 6 albums
Albums produced by Prince (musician)
Warner Records albums
Albums recorded at Sunset Sound Recorders